Sérgio Miguel Lopes Lomba da Costa (born 11 August 1973), better known as Sérgio Lomba, is a Mozambican retired professional football player who played as a defender.

Club career
Lomba is best known for his stints in the Primeira Liga with Gil Vicente and Moreirense.

International career
Lomba is a one-time international for the Mozambique national football team, scoring on his debut in a friendly 2–1 win over Malawi on 25 June 2006.

Personal life
Lomba is maternal uncle of Pedro Neto, who is also a footballer.

References

External links
 Sky Sports Profile
 
 

Living people
1973 births
People from Beira, Mozambique
Mozambican footballers
Mozambique international footballers
Portuguese footballers
Mozambican people of Portuguese descent
Campeonato de Portugal (league) players
Liga Portugal 2 players
Primeira Liga players
Segunda División B players
S.C. Freamunde players
SC Vianense players
Gil Vicente F.C. players
Moreirense F.C. players
F.C. Penafiel players
Mozambican expatriate sportspeople in Spain
Portuguese expatriate sportspeople in Spain
Portuguese expatriate footballers
Mozambican expatriate footballers
Expatriate footballers in Spain
Association football defenders